Cohors [prima] Flavia Ulpia Hispanorum milliaria equitata civium Romanorum ("[1st] part-mounted 1000 strong Flavian and Ulpian cohort of Roman citizens Hispani") was a Roman auxiliary regiment containing cavalry contingents. The cohort stationed in Dacia at castra of Orheiu Bistriței and castra Napoca.

See also 
 List of Roman auxiliary regiments

References
 Academia Română: Istoria Românilor, Vol. 2, Daco-romani, romanici, alogeni, 2nd. Ed., București, 2010, 
 Constantin C. Petolescu: Dacia - Un mileniu de istorie, Ed. Academiei Române, 2010, 
 Petru Ureche: Tactică, strategie și specific de luptă la cohortele equitate din Dacia Romană

Military of ancient Rome
Auxiliary equitata units of ancient Rome
Roman Dacia